Annan Rugby Football Club are a rugby union side based in Annan in Dumfries and Galloway, Scotland.

History

Originally established in 1879, the current club was restarted in 1968. Becoming formally affiliated with the SRU in 1969.

In 2016 they were awarded BT Club of the Season.

The club captain for season 2019–20 is Andrew Jancey.

Sides
Annan Rugby Club hosts a number of teams.

The Teams are:

1st XV
2nd XV
Ladies XV (The Warriors)
U18 Girls XV (The U18 Hornets)
U15 Girls XV (The U15 Hornets)
U18 Boys XV
U15 Boys XV
U14 Boys XV
U13 Boys XV

Plus numerous teams from Primary 1 onwards (girls and boys)

Honours

Club

 BT Club of the Season
 Champions (1): 2016

Men's

 Regional League West 2
 Champions (2): 2012–13, 2015–16
 SRU BT Bowl
 Champions (1): 2002–03
 National League Division 2         
 Champions (1): 1997–98
 National League Division 3
 Champions (1): 1996–97
 National League Division 4
 Champions (1): 1995–96
 National League Division 6
 Champions (1): 1994–95
 National League Division 7
 Champions (1): 1993–94
 Glasgow District League Division 1
 Champions (1): 1992–93
 Glasgow District League Division 2
 Champions (1): 1991–92
 Selkirk Junior Sevens
 Champions (1): 2002
 Stewartry Sevens
 Champions (4): 1981, 1984, 1993, 1994

Women's

 Women's National Division 1 
 Champions (1): 2017-18
 Biggar Sevens
 Champions (1): 2018
 Wigtownshire Sevens
 Champions (2): 1999, 2000

Notable former players

Men

Scotland

The following former Annan RFC players have represented Scotland.

References

External links

Rugby union in Dumfries and Galloway
Scottish rugby union teams
Annan, Dumfries and Galloway